Leonia is a borough in Bergen County, in the U.S. state of New Jersey. As of the 2020 United States census, the borough's population was 9,304, an increase of 367 (+4.1%) from the 2010 census count of 8,937, which in turn reflected an increase of 23 (+0.3%) from the 8,914 counted in the 2000 census. It is a suburb of New York City located near the western approach to the George Washington Bridge.

Leonia was formed as the result of a referendum passed on December 5, 1894, from portions of Ridgefield Township. The borough was formed during the "boroughitis" phenomenon then sweeping through Bergen County, in which 26 boroughs were formed in the county in 1894 alone. Portions of Leonia were taken on February 19, 1895, to form the Township of Teaneck.

New Jersey Monthly magazine ranked Leonia as its 31st best place to live in its 2008 rankings of the "Best Places To Live" in New Jersey.

History
The original inhabitants of Leonia were the Hackensack tribe (Ashkineshacky) of Native Americans. The population was about 1,000 before the Europeans settled in the area. At the time of the American Revolutionary War, Leonia was known as part of the English Neighborhood, a name that survives in neighboring Englewood. It was settled in 1668 mainly by Dutch and English farmers, making it one of the oldest communities in the state and county. A third of the population was African slaves.  It was located on the western slope of the Palisades, and started as a quiet farming community.  Leonia's proximity to New York City and its major universities, theaters and performing venues contributed to Leonia's place in the world of art and academics, with many artists and leading thinkers finding a home there in the twentieth century.

The local economy that had been focused on agriculture underwent economic and cultural growth during the late nineteenth century, marked by the introduction of train service and was originally called West Fort Lee. J. Vreeland Moore and other town leaders chose the name "Leonia" in 1865 in honor of American Revolutionary War General Charles Lee, for whom Fort Lee was named.

After traveling through Leonia upon arriving in New Jersey by ferry at Edgewater in 1899, advertising executive Artemus Ward purchased a large piece of land and established the Leonia Heights Land Company to develop and market housing in the community. His advertising attracted many academics and artists who were drawn to Leonia's small size, culture, and location, earning the town's nickname of the "Athens of New Jersey".

In 1915, the Leonia School of Illustration was established by Harvey Dunn, fostering the artists' colony that subsequently emerged over the next decade. By the 1930s, it had the highest number of residents, per capita, in Who's Who in America and 80% of its residents were college graduates.  Transportation through the borough was enhanced with access to ferries and trolley systems and Leonia became a refuge for many of America's most creative thinkers which included five Nobel Prize winners.

For 200 years, one of the two major avenues that run north-to-south through Leonia, Grand Avenue (the other one is Broad Avenue) was called the English Neighborhood Road. In colonial times, this road served as the main inland route between Paulus Hook, Bergen, and the English Neighborhood. Leonia was a crossroads of the American Revolution and a training ground for American Civil War soldiers.

Historic places in the town include the Civil War Drill Hall and Armory and the Cole-Allaire House, constructed around 1765, making it the oldest dwelling in the borough, and placed on the National Register of Historic Places in 1976. The Vreeland House, constructed in 1786 by Dirck Vreeland and expanded in 1815, was added to the National Register of Historic Places in 1978.

Leonia celebrates "Leonia Day" annually on the third Sunday in May.

Geography
According to the United States Census Bureau, the borough had a total area of 1.63 square miles (4.22 km2), including 1.52 square miles (3.94 km2) of land and 0.11 square miles (0.27 km2) of water (6.50%).

The borough borders the Bergen County municipalities of Englewood, Fort Lee, Palisades Park, Ridgefield Park and Teaneck.

Leonia is designated as a Tree City USA, receiving its 21st annual recognition in 2010 from the National Arbor Day Foundation.

Demographics

2010 census

Same-sex couples headed 35 households in 2010, more than double the 17 counted in 2000.

The Census Bureau's 2006–2010 American Community Survey showed that (in 2010 inflation-adjusted dollars) median household income was $66,271 (with a margin of error of +/− $9,365) and the median family income was $91,129 (+/− $16,890). Males had a median income of $54,754 (+/− $8,175) versus $60,057 (+/− $8,680) for females. The per capita income for the borough was $40,030 (+/− $4,132). About 5.8% of families and 9.1% of the population were below the poverty line, including 12.2% of those under age 18 and 8.9% of those age 65 or over.

2000 census
As of the 2000 United States census there were 8,914 people, 3,271 households, and 2,436 families residing in the borough. The population density was 5,921.3 people per square mile (2,279.3/km2). There were 3,343 housing units at an average density of 2,220.6 per square mile (854.8/km2). The racial makeup of the borough was 65.74% White, 2.27% African American, 0.09% Native American, 26.06% Asian, 0.01% Pacific Islander, 3.20% from other races, and 2.64% from two or more races. Hispanic or Latino of any race were 12.73% of the population.

There were 3,271 households, out of which 36.7% had children under the age of 18 living with them, 61.5% were married couples living together, 9.5% had a female householder with no husband present, and 25.5% were non-families. 22.1% of all households were made up of individuals, and 10.3% had someone living alone who was 65 years of age or older. The average household size was 2.72 and the average family size was 3.20.

In the borough, the population was spread out, with 24.6% under the age of 18, 5.9% from 18 to 24, 29.0% from 25 to 44, 26.9% from 45 to 64, and 13.7% who were 65 years of age or older. The median age was 40 years. For every 100 females, there were 92.7 males. For every 100 females age 18 and over, there were 87.7 males.

The median income for a household in the borough was $72,440, and the median income for a family was $84,591. Males had a median income of $55,156 versus $38,125 for females. The per capita income for the borough was $35,352. About 5.0% of families and 6.5% of the population were below the poverty line, including 9.0% of those under age 18 and 1.8% of those age 65 or over.

As of the 2000 Census, 17.24% of Leonia's residents identified themselves as being of Korean ancestry, which was the fourth-highest in the United States and second highest of any municipality in New Jersey—behind neighboring Palisades Park (36.38%)—for all places with 1,000 or more residents identifying their ancestry. Additionally, 3.07% of Leonia's residents identified themselves as being of Japanese ancestry, which was the fourth highest of any municipality in New Jersey — behind Fort Lee (6.09%), Demarest (3.72%) and Edgewater (3.22%)—for all places with 1,000 or more residents identifying their ancestry.

Arts and culture
Leonia is home to the Players Guild of Leonia, which operates as the oldest continuing theatre troupe in the state of New Jersey, and is one of the oldest community theatre groups in the state with continuous performances since 1919. Performances have included comedies, tragedies, classics, and musicals. The Guild's production of One Mad Night in 1940 was the first three-act play performed on television, when it was broadcast on WPTZ, in Philadelphia, Pennsylvania. In 1963, the Children's Show was instituted and continues each spring. Between 1968 and 1998, the Guild produced Theatre in the Park. Since 2002, the Players' Guild of Leonia has produced a Playwright's Showcase featuring original scripts. The Guild operates out of the historic Civil War Drill Hall Theatre on Grand Avenue which is leased from the borough. Recent productions include Lovers and Other Strangers, The Glass Menagerie, Love, Loss, and What I Wore and Hair. Upcoming productions include a fall production of Guys and Dolls.

Since 2000, Leonia has also been home to Summerstage at Leonia, which produces a Broadway-style family musical each summer in the last two weeks of July. Originally, Summerstage performances were held in the Leonia High School Little Theater, but now take place at the Civil War Drill Hall Theater. Auditions are held in May and open to all in the NY metro area. Past shows have included The Wizard of Oz, Carousel, The Sound of Music, Annie, Oliver, Les Miserables, My Fair Lady, and How To Succeed In Business Without Really Trying.

The Leonia Chamber Musicians Society, founded in 1973, is made up of professional musicians who reside in Leonia, has been performing classical music concerts four times a year at various venues in the borough.

Sculpture for Leonia aims to build the art and cultural environment in Leonia through the display of outdoor sculpture throughout the community and in the Erika and David Boyd Sculpture Garden, which is located on the grounds of the Leonia Borough Annex. This group sponsors an annual Taste of Leonia fundraiser. Leonia Arts provides a calendar of all arts events in Leonia.

Parks and recreation
Leonia has five public recreational areas, of which only the Leonia Swim Club requires a membership fee. The recreation areas include Wood Park, located on the corner of Broad Avenue and Fort Lee Road; Sylvan Park and the Leonia Swim Club, both on Grand Avenue near Sylvan Avenue; and the Recreational Center on Broad Avenue which has an indoor basketball court.

Overpeck County Park, a Bergen County park located in Leonia, Ridgefield Park, and Teaneck, is home of the county's World Trade Center Memorial.

Field Station: Dinosaurs is a dinosaur-themed park located in Overpeck County Park, just south of Interstate 95, with 32 animatronic dinosaurs.

Government

Local government

Leonia is governed under the Borough form of New Jersey municipal government, one of 218 municipalities (of the 564) statewide that use this form, the most common form of government in New Jersey. The governing body is comprised of a Mayor and a Borough Council, with all positions elected at-large on a partisan basis as part of the November general election. A Mayor is elected directly by the voters to a four-year term of office. The Borough Council is comprised of six members who are elected to serve three-year terms on a staggered basis, with two seats coming up for election each year in a three-year cycle. The Borough form of government used by Leonia is a "weak mayor / strong council" government in which council members act as the legislative body with the mayor presiding at meetings and voting only in the event of a tie. The mayor can veto ordinances subject to an override by a two-thirds majority vote of the council. The mayor makes committee and liaison assignments for council members, and most appointments are made by the mayor with the advice and consent of the council.

, the Mayor of Leonia is Democrat Judah Ziegler, whose term of office ends December 31, 2023. The members of the Leonia Borough Council are Council President Louis Grandelis (D, 2024), Maureen E. Davis (D, 2023), Pasquale A. "Pat" Fusco (D, 2023), Christoph Hesterbrink (D, 2025), Joanne Choi Terrell (D, 2024), and Bill Ziegler (D, 2025).

Joanne Choi Terrell was appointed to fill the seat expiring in December 2021 that had been held by Benjamin Choi until he resigned from office in July 2019 to accept a position as a judge in Hoboken, New Jersey.

Peter Knott was appointed to fill the seat vacated by John DeSimone when he took office as mayor and won election to serve the balance of the term through December 2013.

Pat Fusco was appointed in August 2013 to fill the vacant seat of Ik-Seong "I.S." Pak, who had resigned earlier that month citing personal issues. Mark Minichiello was elected in November 2013 to serve the balance of the term.

Federal, state, and county representation
Leonia is located in the 5th Congressional District and is part of New Jersey's 37th state legislative district.

In redistricting following the 2010 census, the borough was in the 9th congressional district, which was in effect from 2013 to 2022.

Politics
As of March 2011, there were a total of 4,713 registered voters in Leonia, of which 2,493 (52.9% vs. 31.7% countywide) were registered as Democrats, 598 (12.7% vs. 21.1%) were registered as Republicans and 1,619 (34.4% vs. 47.1%) were registered as Unaffiliated. There were 3 voters registered as Libertarians or Greens. Among the borough's 2010 Census population, 52.7% (vs. 57.1% in Bergen County) were registered to vote, including 67.9% of those ages 18 and over (vs. 73.7% countywide).

In the 2012 presidential election, Democrat Barack Obama received 2,451 votes (66.8% vs. 54.8% countywide), ahead of Republican Mitt Romney with 1,135 votes (30.9% vs. 43.5%) and other candidates with 47 votes (1.3% vs. 0.9%), among the 3,668 ballots cast by the borough's 5,065 registered voters, for a turnout of 72.4% (vs. 70.4% in Bergen County). In the 2008 presidential election, Democrat Barack Obama received 2,604 votes (65.9% vs. 53.9% countywide), ahead of Republican John McCain with 1,273 votes (32.2% vs. 44.5%) and other candidates with 30 votes (0.8% vs. 0.8%), among the 3,953 ballots cast by the borough's 5,050 registered voters, for a turnout of 78.3% (vs. 76.8% in Bergen County). In the 2004 presidential election, Democrat John Kerry received 2,468 votes (64.4% vs. 51.7% countywide), ahead of Republican George W. Bush with 1,327 votes (34.6% vs. 47.2%) and other candidates with 25 votes (0.7% vs. 0.7%), among the 3,835 ballots cast by the borough's 4,878 registered voters, for a turnout of 78.6% (vs. 76.9% in the whole county).

In the 2013 gubernatorial election, Democrat Barbara Buono received 50.8% of the vote (1,078 cast), ahead of Republican Chris Christie with 47.9% (1,015 votes), and other candidates with 1.3% (27 votes), among the 2,205 ballots cast by the borough's 4,826 registered voters (85 ballots were spoiled), for a turnout of 45.7%. In the 2009 gubernatorial election, Democrat Jon Corzine received 1,682 ballots cast (60.7% vs. 48.0% countywide), ahead of Republican Chris Christie with 901 votes (32.5% vs. 45.8%), Independent Chris Daggett with 120 votes (4.3% vs. 4.7%) and other candidates with 7 votes (0.3% vs. 0.5%), among the 2,773 ballots cast by the borough's 4,880 registered voters, yielding a 56.8% turnout (vs. 50.0% in the county).

Education

Leonia is served by its public system and by a number of private schools.

The Leonia Public Schools serve students from pre-kindergarten through twelfth grade. As of the 2018–19 school year, the district, comprised of three schools, had an enrollment of 1,952 students and 170.6 classroom teachers (on an FTE basis), for a student–teacher ratio of 11.4:1. Schools in the district (with 2018–19 enrollment data from the National Center for Education Statistics) are 
Anna C. Scott Elementary School with 663 students in grades Pre-K–5, 
Leonia Middle School with 533 students in grades 6–8 and 
Leonia High School with 740 students in grades 9–12. Students from Edgewater attend the district's schools for grades 7–12 as part of a sending/receiving relationship with the Edgewater Public Schools.

Public school students from the borough, and all of Bergen County, are eligible to attend the secondary education programs offered by the Bergen County Technical Schools, which include the Bergen County Academies in Hackensack, and the Bergen Tech campus in Teterboro or Paramus. The district offers programs on a shared-time or full-time basis, with admission based on a selective application process and tuition covered by the student's home school district.

St. John the Evangelist School was a Catholic school for students in grades Pre-K–8, operating under the supervision of the Roman Catholic Archdiocese of Newark. After 72 years and generations of graduates, it was closed in June 2013.

Transportation

Roads and highways

Route 93 (Grand Avenue) runs north-south for  through the center of the borough, connecting Palisades Park and Englewood. Interstate 95 (the New Jersey Turnpike) curves along the borough's northern border while U.S. Route 1/9 and U.S. Route 46 briefly enter along the western border with Fort Lee.

Effective January 22, 2018, Leonia officials banned nonresidents from using residential streets (defined as all streets except Fort Lee Road, Grand Avenue, and Broad Avenue) during rush hours. However, due to complaints from business owners citing decreased revenues, Leonia officials are reconsidering.

Public transportation
NJ Transit bus route 166 provides local and express service from Broad Avenue to the Port Authority Bus Terminal in Midtown Manhattan, and route 182 serves the George Washington Bridge Bus Terminal, with local service offered on the 751, 755 and 756 routes.

Rockland Coaches provides service to the Port Authority Bus Terminal on the 11T/11AT, 14ET, 20T and 21T routes.

The Northern Branch Corridor Project is a proposal to extend the Hudson-Bergen Light Rail to restore passenger train service on the CSX tracks, which offered passenger service decades before and is now used for occasional freight service. NJ Transit's plan would include a station in Leonia.

Notable people

People who were born in, residents of, or otherwise closely associated with Leonia include:

 Alan Alda (born 1936), actor
 Arlene Alda (born 1933), photographer and author
 Robert J. Alexander (1918–2010), political activist who studied the trade union movement in Latin America and dissident communist political parties
 Elizabeth Baranger (1927–2019), physicist and academic administrator at the University of Pittsburgh, whose research concerned shell model calculations in nuclear physics
 Freddie Bartholomew (1924–1992), child actor
 Jeff Bell (1943–2018), Republican nominee for U.S. Senate from New Jersey in 2014
 Robert Birmelin (born 1933), figurative painter, printmaker and draughtsman
 Pat Boone (born 1934), singer
 Anthony Bourdain (1956–2018), chef, author and television personality
 Rutherford Boyd (1884–1951), artist
 Verona Burkhard (1910–2004), artist, known for her murals painted for the U.S. Treasury Department
 Carolee Carmello (born 1962), actress
 Charles Shepard Chapman (1879–1962), painter best remembered for his landscape of the Grand Canyon at the American Museum of Natural History
 Kathleen Clark, playwright
 Edwin H. Colbert (1905–2001), paleontologist and author
 Dan Colen (born 1979), artist
 Paul Collins (born 1956), rock musician and author, best known for his work in the power pop groups The Nerves and The Beat
 Robin Cook (born 1940), physician and novelist
 Sam Coppola (1932–2012), actor who played hardware store owner 'Dan Fusco' in the 1977 film Saturday Night Fever
 Alexander Dallin (1924–2000), historian, political scientist, and international relations scholar at Columbia University
 John Darrow (1907–1980), actor of the late silent and early talking film eras
 Sammy Davis Jr. (1925–1990), entertainer
 Wm Theodore de Bary (1919–2017), Sinologist and East Asian literary scholar who was a professor and administrator at Columbia University for nearly 70 years
 Priscilla Dean (1896–1987), actress popular in silent film as well as in theatre, with a career spanning two decades
 Dorothy Dinnerstein (1923–1992), feminist activist, author and academic
 Acheson J. Duncan (1904–1995), statistician and authority in quality control
 Harvey Dunn (1884–1952), illustrator
 Gregg Edelman (born 1958), actor
 Emme (born 1963), plus-size supermodel
 Enrico Fermi (1901–1954), Nobel Prize–winning physicist
 Morton Fried (1923–1986), professor of anthropology at Columbia University
 Ralph Fuller (1890–1963), cartoonist best known for his long running comic strip Oaky Doaks
 Maria Goeppert Mayer (1906–1972), Nobel Prize-winning physicist
 Buddy Hackett (1924–2003), comedian
 Marvin Harris (1927–2001), anthropologist

 Richard Howell (born 1955), a freelance comics artist who drew the second series of Marvel Comics' The Vision and the Scarlet Witch, which was primarily set in Leonia
 Toomas Hendrik Ilves (born 1953), President of Estonia
 Phil Jackson (born 1945), basketball coach
 Leland Jacobs (1907–1992), professor emeritus of education who was known for his education in the field of prose and poetry
 Sid Jacobson (1929 - 2022) American comic books writer. He was managing editor and editor in chief for Harvey Comics.
 Albert Journeay (1890–1972), football player who was captain of the Penn Quakers football team in 1914
 Marshall Kay (1904–1975), geologist and professor at Columbia University
 Marvin Kitman (born 1929), television critic, humorist, and author
 Bob Klapisch, sportswriter
 David Klass, screenwriter and novelist
 Perri Klass, pediatrician and writer who has published extensively about her medical training and pediatric practice
 Dick Kryhoski (1925–2007), first baseman who played in Major League Baseball for five different teams between 1949 and 1955
 Harold Lehman (1913-2006), artist known for his Post-Surrealist paintings, work with the Mexican muralist, David Alfaro Siqueiros, and mural artist who created murals under the WPA for Rikers Island Penitentiary, and the Renovo, PA post office.
 Willard Libby (1908–1980), Nobel Prize–winning scientist who played a lead role in the development of radiocarbon dating
 Robert Ludlum (1927–2001), author
 Philip Maneval (born 1956), composer
 David Mansfield (born 1956), stringed-instrument musician and composer
 Vera Maxwell (1901–1995), fashion designer
 John C. McCloy (1876–1945), sailor twice awarded the Medal of Honor
 Bob McFadden (1923–2000), voiceover actor
 Boris Moishezon (1937–1993), mathematician
 J. Vreeland Moore (1824–1903), brigadier general of the 1st New Jersey Regiment who played a major role in the borough's formation
 Robert F. Murphy (1924–1990), anthropologist
 Norman D. Newell (1909–2005), professor of geology at Columbia University, and chairman and curator of invertebrate paleontology at the American Museum of Natural History
 James Noble (1922–2016), actor
 Christiane Noll (born 1968), singer and actress known for her work in musicals and on the concert stage
 Frank C. Osmers Jr. (1907–1977), represented New Jersey's 9th congressional district from 1939–1943 and 1951–1965
 Clara Elsene Peck (1883–1968), illustrator and painter known for her illustrations of women and children in the early 20th century
 Mary Beth Peil (born 1940), actress
 Howard Post (1926–2010), animator, cartoonist, and comic strip and comic book writer-artist, known for his syndicated newspaper comic strip The Dropouts.
 Carmel Quinn (1925–2021), singer
 Lucinda Rosenfeld (born 1969), novelist
 Ben Ryan (1892–1968), songwriter who wrote the music and lyrics to the popular song (The Gang that Sang) Heart of My Heart
 Giorgio Santelli (1897–1985), fencer and fencing master who was part of the Italian team that won the gold medal in Men's team sabre at the 1920 Summer Olympics and was the largest mid-20th century influence in raising the quality and popularity of fencing in the United States
 Warner R. Schilling (1925–2013), political scientist and international relations scholar at Columbia University
 Gene Shalit (born 1926), longtime film critic on network television
 Willa Shalit (born 1955), artist, theatrical and television producer, photographer, author/editor, and social conscious entrepreneur
 Arshavir Shirakian (1900–1973), Armenian writer who was noted for his assassination of Said Halim Pasha and Cemal Azmi as an act of vengeance for their roles in the Armenian genocide
 Ivory Sully (born 1957), NFL football player for Los Angeles Rams and Tampa Bay Buccaneers
 Al B. Sure! (born 1968), singer, songwriter and producer
 David Syrett (1939–2004), Professor of History at Queens College and researcher and documentary editor on eighteenth-century British naval history and the Battle of the Atlantic during World War II
 Harold Urey (1893–1981), Nobel Prize–winning chemist
 Henry S. Walbridge (1801–1869), member of the United States House of Representatives from New York who served from 1851 to 1852
 Lyndon Woodside (1935–2005), 10th conductor of the Oratorio Society of New York

In popular culture
Leonia briefly served as the home of Scarlet Witch and Vision in several Marvel Comics storylines from the 1980s, mainly in The Vision and the Scarlet Witch series, the second of which was drawn by Leonia resident Richard Howell. This domestic storyline was later loosely adapted in the 2021 TV series WandaVision, although the location was changed to the fictional town of Westview, New Jersey.

See also
 List of U.S. cities with significant Korean-American populations

References

Sources
 Municipal Incorporations of the State of New Jersey (according to Counties) prepared by the Division of Local Government, Department of the Treasury (New Jersey); December 1, 1958.
 Clayton, W. Woodford; and Nelson, William. History of Bergen and Passaic Counties, New Jersey, with Biographical Sketches of Many of its Pioneers and Prominent Men. Philadelphia: Everts and Peck, 1882.
 Harvey, Cornelius Burnham (ed.), Genealogical History of Hudson and Bergen Counties, New Jersey. New York: New Jersey Genealogical Publishing Co., 1900.
 Karels, Carol. Leonia, Images of America Series, Arcadia Publishing, 2002. .
 Mattingly, Paul H. Suburban Landscapes: Culture and Politics in a New York Metropolitan Community. Johns Hopkins University Press, 2001. .
 Van Valen, James M. History of Bergen County, New Jersey. New York: New Jersey Publishing and Engraving Co., 1900.
 Westervelt, Frances A. (Frances Augusta), 1858–1942, History of Bergen County, New Jersey, 1630–1923, Lewis Historical Publishing Company, 1923.

External links

 Leonia official website
 Leonia Public Schools
 
 School Data for the Leonia Public Schools, National Center for Education Statistics
 Leonia website that has easy access to Leonia official website, fire department, ambulance corps, and public schools
 Information about programs and initiatives in Leonia, New Jersey

 
1894 establishments in New Jersey
Borough form of New Jersey government
Boroughs in Bergen County, New Jersey
Populated places established in 1894